Wu Xin (born 29 January 1983), also named Orfila, is a Chinese host and actress who is famous for co-hosting the TV game show Happy Camp which airs on Hunan Satellite TV with fellow hosts He Jiong, Xie Na, Du Haitao, and Li Weijia.

Biography
Wu was born in Shenyang, Liaoning on January 29, 1983. Wu Xin attended Shenyang 120 High School. She graduated from Dalian University of Foreign Language, where she majored in French Language.

Filmography

Film

Animated film

Television series

Variety show

Bibliography

References

External links

 
 

1983 births
Actresses from Shenyang
Dalian University of Foreign Languages alumni
Living people
Actresses from Liaoning
Chinese voice actresses
Chinese film actresses
Chinese television actresses
21st-century Chinese actresses
Participants in Chinese reality television series
Chinese television presenters
Chinese women television presenters
The Amazing Race contestants
Reality show winners